No. 46 Group RAF was a group of the Royal Air Force.

It was established on 17 January 1944 as No. 46 (Transport) Group at Uxbridge Road, Stanmore, within RAF Transport Command. The next month, No. 512 Squadron RAF, flying the Douglas Dakota and located at RAF Broadwell was transferred to 46 Group. The squadron began training in glider towing and dropping parachute supplies. 

Elements of the group (512 and 575 Squadrons) used Bazenville Airfield in the initial Normandy landings bridgehead after the British Army was established ashore on 6 June 1944. Other squadrons in the group involved in the landings were at Down Ampney - two, Nos. 48 and 271 - and at RAF Blakehill Farm, No. 233 Squadron RAF. Other units of the group at the time of the landings were No. 107 (Transport) Operational Training Unit RAF at RAF Leicester East, and No. 1697 (Air Delivery Letter Service) Flight, equipped with modified Hawker Hurricanes to deliver secret mail and small equipment to the Normandy beachheads.

On 5 April 1946 RAF Broadwell and No. 271 Squadron RAF plus the Squadron's Servicing Echelon was transferred into 46 Group from No. 47 (Transport) Group. No. 44 Group RAF disbanded by being amalgamated into 46 Group on 14 August 1946.

After extensive involvement in the Berlin Airlift from June 1948 to September 1949, 46 Group disbanded on 15 October 1949 at Lüneburg Airfield (B 156) in West Germany. It was reformed on 1 November 1949 by renaming 47 Group, but disbanded only five months afterwards on 31 March 1950. King George VI authorised the Group's badge in February 1951 with the motto "Alios Alis Alo" ("With my wings I nourish others").

It was reformed on 1 September 1972 as No. 46 (Strategic Support) Group, RAF Strike Command, to take over half of the previous transport role that the disbanded RAF Air Support Command had carried out. "Early in 1972" RAF Brize Norton had come under the Group's control, at the time hosting Nos 10, 53, 99 and 511 Squadrons. RAF Lyneham was also under the Group's auspices after the war. Air Marshal Denis Crowley-Milling served as Air Officer Commanding from 3 January 1973 to 7 January 1974. It was merged into No. 38 Group on 1 January 1976 and thus disbanded.

References 

http://www.waterbeachmilitarymuseum.org.uk/history_page.html - four squadrons of Dakotas took part in Berlin Airlift under 46 Group from RAF Waterbeach 

046
Transport units and formations of the Royal Air Force
Military units and formations disestablished in 1976